is a waterfall in Fujinomiya, Shizuoka Prefecture, near Mount Fuji, Japan. It is part of Fuji-Hakone-Izu National Park and has been protected since 1936 as a Japanese Natural Monument.

The falls were regarded as sacred under the Fuji cult. Another waterfall, the Otodome Falls is approximately a five-minute walk away.

The Shiraito Falls is listed as one of "Japan’s Top 100 Waterfalls", in a listing published by the Japanese Ministry of the Environment in 1990. It was also selected by the Tokyo Nichi Nichi Shimbun and Osaka Mainichi Shimbun. as one of the 100 Landscapes of Japan in 1927. In 2013 the waterfall was added to the World Heritage List as part of the Fujisan Cultural Site.

See also
List of Places of Scenic Beauty of Japan (Shizuoka)

References

 Southerland, Mary and Britton, Dorothy. The National Parks of Japan. Kodansha International (1995).

External links

 Fujinomiya home page

Waterfalls of Japan
Fuji-Hakone-Izu National Park
Landforms of Shizuoka Prefecture
Tourist attractions in Shizuoka Prefecture
World Heritage Sites in Japan
Fujinomiya, Shizuoka
Places of Scenic Beauty